Bromyrite or bromargyrite is a natural mineral form of silver bromide found mainly in Mexico and Chile. Hardness is 1.5 to 2. Related are chlorargyrite and iodyrite.

It was first described in 1859 for an occurrence in Plateros, Zacatecas, Mexico where it occurred in a silver deposit as an oxidation product of primary ore minerals. It occurs in arid environments along with native silver, iodargyrite and smithsonite along with iron and manganese oxide minerals.

References

Bromides
Silver minerals
Halide minerals
Cubic minerals
Minerals in space group 225